This article contains information about the literary events and publications of 1544.

Events
Summer – The engraver and publisher Cornelis Bos relocates from Antwerp to Paris, after becoming involved with an antisacerdotalist, free-thinking spiritualist sect. In his absence, he is declared to be exiled by the Council of Brabant.
December 31 – Eleven-year-old Princess Elizabeth of England presents her stepmother, Catherine Parr, with a manuscript book entitled The Miroir or Glasse of the Synneful Soul. 
unknown dates
The University of Paris prohibits the printing of any book not approved by the appropriate University officials.
The first (partial) Latin translation of Achilles Tatius' Leucippe and Clitophon, made by Annibal della Croce (Crucejus), is published in Lyon.

New books

Prose
Cardinal John Fisher – Psalmi seu precationes (posthumous) in an anonymous English translation by its sponsor, Catherine Parr, queen of King Henry VIII of England
John Leland – Assertio inclytissimi Arturii regis Britanniae
Sebastian Münster – Cosmographia
Guillaume Postel – De orbis terrae concordia
Domingo de Vico – Los Proverbios de Salomón, las Epístolas y los Evangelios de todo el año, en lengua mexicana ("The Proverbs of Solomon, the Epistles and Gospels for the whole year, in the Mexican tongue"; later prohibited by the Spanish Inquisition)
Sefer HaYashar, printed in Venice
Michael Stifel – Arithmetica integra
Tripartito del Christianissimo y consolatorio doctor Juan Gerson, the first Mexican book with woodcut illustrations, published by Juan Pablos.
William Turner – Avium praecipuarum, quarum apud Plinium et Aristotelem mentio est, brevis et succincta historia (Brief and Succinct Account of Chief Birds Mentioned by Pliny and Aristotle; first English book devoted wholly to birds)
Vidus Vidius – Chirurgia

Poetry
See also 1544 in poetry
Clément Marot – Œuvres (definitive edition)

Births
May 24 – William Gilbert, astronomer and natural philosopher (died 1603)

Deaths
September 12 – Clément Marot, French poet (born 1496)
December – Denis Janot, French printer
Unknown dates
Pedro Damiano, Portuguese chess player and writer (born 1480)
Nilakantha Somayaji, Keralan mathematician and astronomer (born 1444)

References

Years of the 16th century in literature